Benedict of Skalka or Szkalka (10th century –d. 1012), born Stojislav in Nitra, Hungarian Kingdom (modern day Slovakia), was a Benedictine monk, now venerated as a saint. He became a hermit and lived an austere life in a cave along the Vah River. Benedict was strangled to death in 1012 by a gang of robbers looking for treasure. He is venerated in Slovakia, Hungary, Poland and the emigrant diasporas in the United States.

Life
Benedict became a monk at the St. Hippolytus Monastery on Mount Zobor near Nitra, Slovakia (then Kingdom of Hungary)  in the late 10th or early 11th century. He later became a hermit with his fellow saint and spiritual teacher Andrew Zorard. They lived an austere life in a cave along the Váh River near Trenčín, in modern Skalka nad Váhom, Slovakia - then part of the Kingdom of Hungary.

Andrew died in 1009, but Benedict continued to live in the cave for three years until he was strangled to death in 1012 by a gang of robbers looking for treasure. The thieves dumped his body in the Váh River, but his body was found perfectly preserved a year later. In 1083 his relics were translated to the St. Emmeram's Cathedral in Nitra where they remain to this day. A biography of Benedict and Andrew was written by Maurus, Bishop of Pécs.

He was renowned for his piety and strict asceticism.

Feast Day and Veneration

Benedict is venerated especially in Slovakia, Hungary, and Poland, but also in the United States. His feast day is 1 May, but in some calendars he is venerated together with Andrew Zorard on 13 June or 17 July.

See also 
 Saint Benedict of Szkalka, patron saint archive

References

External links
 Saint Benedict of Szkalka at Patron Saints Index
 Benedikt av Skalka 

11th-century Christian saints
Medieval Hungarian saints
Hungarian Roman Catholic saints
Hungarian Benedictines
1012 deaths
10th-century Hungarian people
11th-century Hungarian people
Hungarian hermits